Bigfoot and Wildboy was a live action children's television series on ABC. It began in 1977 as a part of The Krofft Supershow on Saturday mornings. Each episode was 15 minutes long, with cliffhanger endings resolved the following week. It became its own series in 1979 with twelve 30-minute episodes. There were a total of 28 episodes produced.

The series was heavily influenced by the two-part Bigfoot episodes of The Six Million Dollar Man, from the super-powered Bigfoot character to "bionic" sound effects used for Bigfoot running and leaping and the use of slow motion photography for action scenes such as throwing a giant object or uprooting a large metal fence post.

Plot
Bigfoot finds a young boy lost in the vast wilderness of the Northwestern United States. Bigfoot raises the boy who becomes known as Wildboy. Now, eight years later, they fight crime and aliens who show up around their forest home.

Cast
 Ray Young as Bigfoot
 Joseph Butcher as Wildboy
 Monika Ramirez as Susie (Season 1)
 Ned Romero as Ranger Lucas (Season 1)
 Yvonne Regalado as Cindy (Season 2)
 Al Wyatt Jr. as Cindy's dad (Season 2)

Episodes

The Krofft Supershow (1977)

Bigfoot and Wildboy (1979)

Syndication
Cox Cable's "Retro Saturday Morning" aired the first eight two-part episodes of "Bigfoot and Wildboy" in 2003 and 2004 as part of the second season of the Krofft Supershow.

Home media
Only two releases were available in the 1980s by Embassy Video, "Bigfoot and Wildboy Volume One" (with "The Secret Invasion" and "Space Prisoner") and "Bigfoot and Wildboy Volume Two" (with "Outlaw Bigfoot", "Eye of the Mummy" and "Birth of the Titan"). Both are now out of print. Columbia House released The World Of Sid and Marty Krofft series, which contained Bigfoot and Wildboy episodes. Rhino Video released a three-DVD collection also called The World Of Sid and Marty Krofft in 2002 included "The Return Of The Vampire" episode.

References

External links
 
 70's Live Action Kid Vid
 Yvonne Regalado Martin

1977 American television series debuts
1979 American television series endings
1970s American children's television series
American Broadcasting Company original programming
American children's science fiction television series
Television about Bigfoot
English-language television shows
Television series by Sid and Marty Krofft Television Productions
The Krofft Supershow
Television series created by Joe Ruby
Television shows set in the United States
Television series created by Ken Spears